Soul Connection is an album by American organist John Patton recorded in 1983 and released on the Nilva label.

Reception

The Allmusic review by Thom Jurek awarded the album 3½ stars and stated "It is the lost gem in his catalog and showcases him in one of the most provocative quintets in his career; it feels quite directly like an extension of Patton's late Blue Note period on titles like Memphis to New York Spirit and Accent on the Blues... This is a necessary Patton date for fans". The All About Jazz review by Jerry D'Souza stated "Patton had a strong band with him on this record... Time has not effaced nor worn the impact of this music. It is still relevant".

Track listing
All compositions by John Patton except as indicated
 "Soul Connection" (Duško Gojković) - 9:49 
 "Pinto" - 5:19 
 "Extensions" - 6:51 
 "Space Station" (Grachan Moncur III) - 5:39 
 "The Coaster" (Moncur) - 12:44 
Recorded on June 7, 1983.

Personnel
John Patton - organ
Grachan Moncur III - trombone
Grant Reed - tenor saxophone 
Melvin Sparks - guitar 
Alvin Queen - drums

References

Nilva Records albums
John Patton (musician) albums
1983 albums